The 2019 Basketball League of Serbia playoffs is the play-off tournament that decides the winner of the 2018–19 Basketball League of Serbia season. The playoffs is scheduled to start on 2 June and end on 20 June 2019.

Qualified teams 

Source

Bracket

Semifinals

|}

Crvena zvezda mts v Mega Bemax

Partizan NIS v FMP

Finals

|}

Game 1

Game 2

Game 3

Game 4

See also 
 List of current Basketball League of Serbia team rosters
 2019 ABA League First Division Playoffs
Teams 
 2018–19 KK Crvena zvezda season
 2018–19 KK Partizan season

References

External links 
 Official website
 Serbian League at Eurobasket.com

playoffs
2018–19 in Serbian basketball
Basketball League of Serbia playoffs